Jerwu Bala  is a village in Khwahan District in Badakhshan province  in north-eastern Afghanistan.

References

External links
Bala/ Satellite map at Maplandia.com

Populated places in Khwahan District